New York Crystal Palace was an exhibition building constructed for the Exhibition of the Industry of All Nations in New York City in 1853, which was under the presidency of the mayor Jacob Aaron Westervelt. The building stood in Reservoir Square.

Use in the exhibition 
New York City's 1853 Exhibition was held on a site behind the Croton Distributing Reservoir, between Fifth and Sixth Avenues on 42nd Street, in what is today Bryant Park in the borough of Manhattan. The New York Crystal Palace was designed by Georg Carstensen and German architect Charles Gildemeister, and was directly inspired by The Crystal Palace built in London's Hyde Park to house The Great Exhibition of 1851. The New York Crystal Palace had the shape of a Greek cross, and was crowned by a dome  in diameter. Like the Crystal Palace of London, it was constructed from iron and glass. Construction was handled by engineer Christian Edward Detmold. Horatio Allen was the consulting engineer, and Edmund Hurry the consulting architect.

President Franklin Pierce spoke at the dedication on July 14, 1853. Theodore Sedgwick was the first president of the Crystal Palace Association. After a year, he was succeeded by Phineas T. Barnum who put together a reinauguration in May 1854 when Henry Ward Beecher and Elihu Burritt were the featured orators.  This revived interest in the Palace, but by the end of 1856 it was a dead property.
Elisha Otis demonstrated the safety elevator, which prevented the fall of the cab if the cable broke, at the Crystal Palace in 1854 in a dramatic presentation.

Observatory 
The Crystal Palace itself barely escaped destruction.

Destruction 

The New York Crystal Palace was destroyed by fire on October 5, 1858, during the American Institute Fair held there. The fire began in a lumber room on the side adjacent to 42nd Street. Within fifteen minutes its dome fell and in twenty-five minutes the entire structure had burned to the ground. There were no deaths but the loss of property amounted to more than $350,000. This included the building, valued at $125,000, and exhibits and valuable statuary remaining from the World's Fair.

References
Notes

Bibliography
Burrows, Edwin G. The Finest Building in America: The New York Crystal Palace 1853-1858 (New York: Oxford University Press, 2018) 
Carstensen & Gildemeister, New York Crystal Palace: illustrated description of the building by Geo. Carstensen & Chs. Gildemeister, architects of the building ; with an oil-color exterior view, and six large plates containing plans, elevations, sections, and details, from the working drawings of the architects (New York: Riker, Thorne & co., 1854)
CUNY Graduate Center, "Crystal Palace/42 Street/1853-54" ; Catalogue by Linda Hyman of an exhibition mounted at the Graduate Center Mall from October 7 to 26, 1974.  [36] pp, 22 b/w illustrations, bibliographic note. (New York: CUNY Graduate Center, 1974)

External links

New York Crystal Palace:1853. Digital Publication, Bard Graduate Center. March 24, 2017.

History of Bryant Park
The Great Crystal Palace Fire of 1858 from the Museum of the City of New York Collections blog
The New York Crystal Palace Records at the New York Historical Society

Building and structure fires in New York City
Event venues in Manhattan
Burned buildings and structures in the United States
Commercial buildings completed in 1853
Demolished buildings and structures in Manhattan
World's fair architecture in New York City
World's fairs in New York City
19th century in New York City
1858 fires in the  United States
Bryant Park buildings
Commercial building fires
Building collapses in the United States
Building collapses caused by fire